Raimo Seppänen (born 21 October 1950) is a Finnish biathlete. He competed in the 20 km individual event at the 1980 Winter Olympics.

References

External links
 

1950 births
Living people
Finnish male biathletes
Olympic biathletes of Finland
Biathletes at the 1980 Winter Olympics
People from Suomussalmi
Sportspeople from Kainuu